Andrić is a Croatian and Serbian surname, derived from Andrija. It may refer to:

 Andric noble family, medieval noble house from Serbia
 Domagoj Andrić (born 1933), Croatian composer and conductor
 Dragan Andrić (born 1962), former Yugoslav water poloist
 Dragan Andrić (born 1975), Serbian politician
 Dragan Andrić (born 1989), Serbian footballer
 Dragan Andrić "Andra", former bass guitar player of the Serbian band Piloti
 Dušan Andrić (born 1946), former Yugoslav footballer
 Ivo Andrić (1892–1975), Yugoslav novelist and Nobel laureate
 Ivo Andrić-Lužanski (born 1956), Bosnian Croat politician
 Jerolim Andrić (1807–1879), Croatian theologian, writer, pedagogue and politician
 Josip Andrić (1894–1967), Croatian writer, translator and composer
 Klara Andric (born 1981), Austrian politician
 Komnen Andrić (born 1995), Serbian footballer
 Lukša Andrić (born 1985), Croatian basketball player
 Mario Andric (born 1998), Austrian footballer
 Mihajlo Andrić (born 1994), Serbian basketball player
 Mila Andrić (born 1990), Serbian hurdler
 Miodrag Andrić (1943-1989), Serbian actor
 Mirko Andrić Gudžuli (born 1926), Croatian poet and writer
 Mirko Andrić (born 1976), Serbian footballer
 Neda Andrić (1927–2010), Croatian economist
 Nemanja Andrić (born 1987), Serbian footballer
 Nikola Andrić (1867–1942), Croatian writer, philologist and translator.
 Nikola Andrić (born 1992), Serbian footballer
 Srđan Andrić (born 1980), Croatian footballer
 Stefan Andrić (born 1996), Serbian-born Macedonian footballer
 Vicko Andrić (1793–1866), Croatian architect
 Viktor Andrić, formerly known as Ivica Rajić (born 1958), Croatian military officer and convicted war criminal
 Vjekoslav Andrić (born 1992), Slovenian footballer

See also
 Androić
 Andrejić

Croatian surnames
Serbian surnames
Patronymic surnames
Surnames from given names